ciao

Liliane Juchli (19 October 1933 – 30 November 2020) was a Swiss nurse and member of the Merciful Sisters of the Holy Cross (German: Barmherzige Schwestern des Heiligen Kreuzes, French: Sœurs de la charité de la Sainte-Croix, Latin: Congregatio Sororum Caritatis Sanctae Crucis), a Swiss Catholic order that follows the Franciscan tradition.

Biography
She was the main author of a highly influential German-language nursing textbook which was simply called "the Juchli". She was also responsible for extending Nancy Roper's activities of daily living nursing model and disseminating it in Europe. She died of COVID-19.

Works 
From 1953 to 1969, she edited her own teaching papers, resulting in a 300-page textbook that was used internally at the Theodosianum Hospital and Nursing School in Zurich. She was then approached by the Thieme publishing house of Stuttgart, which resulted in the publication of Umfassende Krankenpflege. 1989 saw the 550,000th copy sold. The 6th edition (1991) was the first to contain more than 1,000 pages. For the 8th edition, the editorial responsibility was transferred to the publisher.
1st Edition: 
7th Edition: 
15th Edition:

Other works

Literature

Sources

External links 
 Website of Juchli and her library

1933 births
2020 deaths
Swiss nurses
People from Baden District, Aargau
Swiss Roman Catholic religious sisters and nuns
Officers Crosses of the Order of Merit of the Federal Republic of Germany
Deaths from the COVID-19 pandemic in Switzerland